No Rodeo ran seven independent candidates at the 2006 South Australian state election.

Adelaide • Amanda Barlow

Giles • Esmond Vettoretti

Kaurna • Jeanie Walker

Light • Craig Allan

Newland • Troy Walker

Reynell • Marie Nicholls

Stuart • Simon Cook

This situation arose out of the significant public attention focussed on the treatment of animals at rodeo events during the previous two years.  The high level of public interest was a result of the professional documentation of routine rodeo cruelty by Jeanie and Troy Walker.

The total number of first preference votes received by the seven independent candidates was reasonable at 2131, particularly given that the independent candidates campaigned on a shoe-string budget.  There was no television, radio or print advertising available to the “No Rodeo” independent candidates as funds simply did not permit.  The major campaign expense was the purchase of election posters, yet the total number of election posters used by the “No Rodeo” candidates was still only 400.  This small number of posters was divided between the seven candidates.

The independent “No Rodeo” candidates were prior to the election well aware of the limitations of their campaign.  They were not naïve and never believed themselves to be serious election contenders.  The aim of the candidates was to raise awareness of rodeo cruelty and other justice issues and to network with people who held similar concerns.  This aim was achieved and the campaign to ban bucking, roping and steer wrestling rodeo events has continued and grown stronger since March 2006.

It is also significant to note that 29,042 first preference lower house votes went to minor and major party candidates who during the election campaign publicly supported a ban on bucking, roping and steer wrestling rodeo events.

References

External links
Official homepage  [Dead link]
Candidates   [Dead link]

Political parties in South Australia